Exempt secretary was a management position in some organizations of governing position (such as the Communist Party of the Soviet Union, CPSU) in the Soviet Union. 

Virtually every workplace in the Soviet Union had lower-level subdivisions of the three major Soviet organizations: the CPSU, Komsomol, and Soviet trade unions. Heads of these organizations were titled "secretary". For small organizational subdivisions the secretary was usually an employee of the corresponding workplace subdivisions. For sufficiently large organizational subdivisions, the elected secretary was either temporarily relieved from his workplace duties, or, more frequently, was part of nomenklatura and his salary was paid from the membership dues of the corresponding organization.

Occupations in the Communist Party of the Soviet Union
Management occupations